List of the museums in Armenia

History Museum of Armenia
Mesrop Mashtots Institute of Ancient Manuscripts
National Gallery of Armenia
Yerevan History Museum
Charents Museum of Literature and Arts
Cafesjian Center for the Arts
ARF History Museum
Erebuni Museum of the Erebuni Fortress
Museum of Folk Art of Armenia
Modern Art Museum of Yerevan
Armenian Genocide Museum-Institute
Geology Museum of Gyumri
Dzitoghtsyan Museum of National Architecture
Zoological Museum-Institute
Natural History Museum of Armenia
Geological Museum after H. Karapetyan
National Museum-Institute of Architecture named after Alexander Tamanian 
Sergei Parajanov Museum
Mother Armenia Military Museum
Middle East Art Museum
Armenia Ethnography Museum
Armenian Medical Museum
Service for the Protection of Historical Environment and Cultural Museum-Reserves

House-museums, biography
General Andranik Museum of Patriotic Movement
House-Museum of Aram Khachaturian
House-Museum of Hovhannes Tumanyan 
House-Museum of Yeghishe Charents 
House-Museum of Avetik Isahakyan 
House-Museum of Alexander Spendiaryan 
House-Museum of Yervand Kochar
House-Museum of Khachatur Abovian 
House Museum of Minas Avetisyan
House-Museum of Derenik Demirchian
House-Museum of Martiros Saryan
House-Museum of Stepan Shahumyan
House-Museum of Hovhannes Shiraz
House-Museum of Silva Kaputikyan

See also 
Museums and Libraries in Yerevan

References

Museums
Museums